Athletics events at the 2012 Summer Paralympics were held in the Olympic Stadium and in The Mall in London, United Kingdom, from 31 August to 9 September 2012.

Classification
Athletes were given a classification depending on the type and extent of their disability. The classification system allowed athletes to compete against others with a similar level of function.

The athletics classifications are:
11–13: Blind (11) and visually impaired (12, 13) athletes
20: Athletes with an intellectual disability
31–38: Athletes with cerebral palsy
40: Les Autres (others) (including people with dwarfism)
42–46: Amputees
51–58: Athletes with a spinal cord disability

The class numbers were given prefixes of "T", "F" and "P" for track, field and pentathlon events, respectively.

Visually impaired athletes classified 11 run with full eye shades and a guide runner; those classified 12 have the option of using a guide; those classified 13 did not use a guide runner. Guide runners were awarded medals alongside their athletes.

Schedule

Medal summary

Men's events

Women's events

See also
Athletics at the 2012 Summer Olympics

References

External links
International Paralympic Committee - Athletics classification regulations

T F11-13